Comoros joined the Confederation of African Football in 2003 following the formation of the Comoros Football Federation, the national football association, in 1979. Comoros were accepted as full members of FIFA in 2005.

Domestic League

At the highest level, the country's domestic competition consists of the Comoros Premier League and the Comoros Cup.  Coin Nord is the country's most decorated club, having won the league title on six occasions.

League system

National team

Following accession to FIFA's full member status, the Comoros national football team has competed for entry to the African Cup of Nations and World Cup since 2010; its qualifying campaigns for both competitions were unsuccessful.
 In the  2021 Africa Cup of Nations Comoros reached the second round of the competition for the first time.

Comoros stadiums

References